The Chrysler A platform was the basis for smaller rear wheel drive cars in the 1960s. These cars are sometimes referred to as A-body cars.

Cars using the A platform in various markets around the world include:
 1960-1976 Plymouth Valiant
 1960-1981 Chrysler Valiant
 1961-1962 Dodge Lancer
 1961-1963 DeSoto Rebel
 1963-1976 Dodge Dart
 1964-1969 Plymouth Barracuda
 1971-1976 Plymouth Scamp
 1970-1976 Plymouth Duster
 1971-1972 Dodge Demon
 1971-1978 Valiant Charger
 1969-1970 Valiant VF
 1970-1971 Valiant VG
This list is not complete:  A-platform vehicles not included on this list were sold in some countries until 1981.

Wheelbases:
 106.5 in
 1960-1962 Valiant, Chrysler Valiant, & Plymouth Valiant (worldwide)
 1961-1962 Dodge Lancer
 1961-1963 DeSoto Rebel (South Africa)
 106 in
 1963-1966 Plymouth Valiant (USA, Mexico, Europe)
 1964-1966 Plymouth Barracuda
 1963-1966 Dodge Dart wagon
 1965 Valiant V100, Custom 100 (Canada)
 108 in
 1967-1973 Plymouth Valiant
 1967-1969 Plymouth Barracuda
 1970-1976 Plymouth Duster
 1971-1972 Dodge Demon
 1973-1976 Dodge Dart Sport
 111 in
 1963-1966 Chrysler Valiant (Argentina, Brazil)
 1971-1976 Plymouth Scamp
 1974-1976 Plymouth Valiant
 1963-1976 Dodge Dart
 1963-1964 & 1966 Chrysler Valiant (Canada)
 1965 Valiant V200, Custom 200 (Canada)

1989
The "A" name was reused again for the mid-size Chrysler LeBaron, Dodge Spirit and Plymouth Acclaim sedans, though this was changed to AA when Chrysler moved to two-letter names for 1990. The "AA" cars lasted until 1995 when replaced by the more modern, but less popular, JA "Cloud Cars" in the same year.

Cars that used the front wheel drive AA platform were:
 1990-1994 Chrysler LeBaron sedan
 1989-1995 Chrysler Saratoga (export only)
 1989-1995 Dodge Spirit
 1989-1995 Plymouth Acclaim

See also
 Chrysler platforms

References

A